There has been a significant community of Russians in Belgium since the  19th century.

Migration history
Migration from Russia to Belgium grew in line with increasing commercial relations between the two countries in the late 19th century. By 1910, there were already roughly 7,500 Russians in the country, including many students in universities at Brussels, Ghent, and Liège. The post-Russian Revolution community of Russians in Belgium comprised mostly Russian military personnel. Former Tsarist officers maintained numerous relations with Belgian anti-communist organisations. By 1937, there were already about 8,000 Russians in the country, largely concentrated in Brussels and the Francophone portions of the country. Belgium was the only country whose Russian émigré population increased during the 1930s.

Numbers
, official statistics showed 7,176 Russian citizens in Belgium. Another 3,407 Russian citizens obtained Belgian nationality between 1992 and 2007. Overall, 10,244 persons coming from countries of the former USSR obtained Belgian citizenship between 1990 and 2007.

Notable people

See also
Russians
Belgium–Russia relations
Demographics of Belgium

Footnotes

Bibliography

Further reading

 Bauchpas, F. (1968), L'émigration blanche, Paris

External links
Site of the Russian community in Belgium

 

Ethnic groups in Belgium
Belgium
Belgium